Else Mayer (1891–1962) was a German nun and women's liberation activist during the period of first-wave feminism. She was one of the pioneers of the German Women's Liberation Movement. Together with Alexandra Bischoff she founded the Erlöserbund.

Biography
Else Mayer was the daughter of the German jeweler Victor Mayer. She spent her childhood and youth in the family business before she became a nun. After she visited several nunneries she decided to found her own, Erlöserbund, in 1916. With the support of her family she bought buildings in Bonn and started to support young female students who received housing from her.

Erlöserbund was closed in 2005 and reorganized as a charitable foundation. The Else Mayer Foundation presents an annual award, the Else Mayer Award, to applicants who are deemed to qualify as ideological successors to Else Mayer. The award is for 4000 euros. German Education Minister Annette Schavan was the inaugural recipient of this award in 2006. The German feminist Alice Schwarzer received the award in 2007.

Publications 

 The Else Mayer Foundation official Website 
The Donation Else Mayer /
Else Mayer Award 
Bonn Newspaper

References 

20th-century German Roman Catholic nuns
German activists
German women activists
German women's rights activists
First-wave feminism
Catholic feminists
1891 births
1962 deaths